The Cortland Wagonmakers was the primary name of the minor league baseball teams based in Cortland, New York between 1897 and 1905. Corltland teams played as members of the New York State League from 1897 to 1901 and the Empire State League in 1905.

History
Cortland first began minor league baseball play in 1897, when the Cortland Hirelings became charter members of the Class C level New York State League. The Cortland franchise joined the league on June 2, 1897 after the season had already begun. Cortland completed the season and had a 29–36 record with a winning percentage that placed 5th in the league standings. The team was managed by George Geer and Otis Smith as the Hirelings finished behind the 1st place Canandaigua Rustlers 

The Cortland Wagonmakers continued play in the 1898 the New York State League as the league became an eight team league. The Wagonmakers finished in 5th place with a record of 45–49. Thomas McGuirk, Ed Delaney and Frank Leonard managed the team in 1898, as the Wagonmakers finished 8.5 games behind the 1st place Canandaigua Rustlers.

The Cortland use of the "Wagonmakers" moniker corresponds to local industry in Cortland, New York in the era. The city was home to numerous carriage and wagon manufacturers in the era, including the Brockway Carriage Works.

Finishing above .500 for the first time in 1899, the Cortland Wagonmakers placed 3rd in the eight–team New York State League. Finishing with a 56–46 record, the Wagonmakers were managed by Henry Ramsey. Cortland finished 17.0 games behind the 1st place Rome Romans in the final standings, as the league did not hold playoffs for its duration.

Cortland improved to place in 2nd place in 1900. Managed by J.D. Roche, the Wagonmakers had a 70–43 record in the New York State League final standings. Cortland finished 2.0 games behind the 1st place Utica Reds.

The Cortland franchise relocated in 1901. On July 11, 1901, the Cortland Wagonmakers had a 22–34 record when the franchise moved to Waverly, New York. Completing the season as the Waverly Wagonmakers, the team had an overall record of 36–68, placing 7th in the New York State League under managers William A. Smith and M.T. Roche.

After a three season hiatus, the 1905 Cortland team resumed minor league play. Cortland joined the Independent level Empire State League for the 1905 season. The franchise folded from the league on July 18, 1905. The Cortland record and standing from 1905 are unknown. Cortland has not hosted another minor league baseball team.

In 2008, a vintage baseball game was held honoring the Cortland Wagonmakers. The team honoring the Cortland Wagonmakers played against a team from Truxton, honoring the Truxton Giants. The teams played a double header using rules from the era.

The ballpark
The name of the Cortland minor league home ballpark(s) is not referenced.

Timeline

Year–by–year records

Notable alumni

Larry Battam (1898)
Elmer Bliss (1901)
Buttons Briggs (1899)
Matt Broderick (1901)
Tun Berger (1897)
Wid Conroy (1899)
Dan Coogan (1900–1901)
Fred Donovan (1901)
Mal Eason (1900)
Frank Foutz (1898)
Bill Friel (1897–1898)
Billy Gannon (1899–1901)
Billy Ging (1901)
Ed Householder (1898)
Jim Jones (1898)
Fred Ketchum (1897–1899)
Frank LaPorte (1898)
Jim McCormick (1900–1901)
Sandy McDougal (1901)
Sam McMackin (1898)
Kohly Miller (1898)
Carlton Molesworth (1898, 1901)
Pat Moran (1898)
Jack O'Neill (1897)
Pete O'Brien (1900–1901)
Mark Polhemus (1898)
Bobby Rothermel (1899)
Danny Shay (1898)
Bucky Veil (1900)
Joe Wall (1901)
Stan Yerkes (1897–1898)

See also
Cortland Wagonmakers playersCortland Hirelings playersCortland (minor league baseball) players

References

External links
Baseball Reference

Defunct minor league baseball teams
Defunct baseball teams in New York (state)
New York State League teams
Baseball teams established in 1898
Baseball teams disestablished in 1905
1898 establishments in New York (state)
1905 disestablishments in New York (state)
Professional baseball teams in New York (state)
Cortland County, New York